Oleksii Kolomiiets (born 1997) is a Ukrainian deaf swimmer. He made his Deaflympic debut during the 2017 Summer Deaflympics.

Career 
He competed at the 2017 Summer Deaflympics in Samsun and claimed two medals in his debut appearance at the multi-sport event. He claimed a silver medal in the men's 50m breaststroke and also clinched a bronze in men's 4 × 100m medley relay. He also competed and qualified for the final rounds in men's 100m breaststroke and 200m breaststroke events finishing at fourth and fifth places respectively.

He made his second Deaflympic appearance representing Ukraine at the 2021 Summer Deaflympics and he was one of the first gold medalists since the start of the 2021 Deaflympics in Brazil after claiming a gold medal in the men's 50m butterfly event. He also later went onto clinch a gold in the men's 100m breaststroke category.

References 

Deaf swimmers
Living people
1997 births
Ukrainian male breaststroke swimmers
Ukrainian male freestyle swimmers
Ukrainian male medley swimmers
Ukrainian deaf people
Deaflympic gold medalists for Ukraine
Deaflympic silver medalists for Ukraine
Deaflympic bronze medalists for Ukraine
Medalists at the 2017 Summer Deaflympics
Medalists at the 2021 Summer Deaflympics
Swimmers at the 2017 Summer Deaflympics
Swimmers at the 2021 Summer Deaflympics
Deaflympic swimmers of Ukraine
21st-century Ukrainian people